The 1914 VFL Grand Final was an Australian rules football game contested between the  Carlton Football Club and South Melbourne Football Club, held at the Melbourne Cricket Ground in Melbourne on 26 September 1914. It was the 17th annual Grand Final of the Victorian Football League, staged to determine the premiers for the 1914 VFL season. The match, attended by 30,495 spectators, was won by Carlton by a margin of 6 points,  marking that club's fourth premiership victory.

In a dramatic last minute, with South Melbourne trailing by six points, the ball was kicked into their forward 50.  Ernie Jamieson of Carlton leaped into the back of South Melbourne player Tom Bollard at full-forward, to punch the ball away, but a free kick was not given, allowing the ball to be cleared to safety and give Carlton victory.

Teams

 Umpire - Harry Rawle

Statistics

Goalkickers

Attendance
 MCG crowd - 30,495

References
AFL Tables: 1914 Grand Final
 The Official statistical history of the AFL 2004 
 Ross, J. (ed), 100 Years of Australian Football 1897-1996: The Complete Story of the AFL, All the Big Stories, All the Great Pictures, All the Champions, Every AFL Season Reported, Viking, (Ringwood), 1996.

See also
 1914 VFL season

VFL/AFL Grand Finals
Grand
Carlton Football Club
Sydney Swans
September 1914 sports events